"This Place Hotel" (originally named "Heartbreak Hotel") is a 1980 song by the Jacksons, written  by Michael Jackson. While his brothers did not sing background vocals, they were credited with playing percussion on the album while brother Tito contributed a guitar solo. The song has a tempo of 98 beats per minute, making it notably slower than many of the other disco-based songs on the album. In the song, the protagonist speaks of a time when ten years ago, he took his girlfriend to a hotel for a romantic night—only to find out that it was designed specifically to break couples up. The staff at the hotel gave the girl the impression that he had cheated on her with someone else, something he did not do, which caused her to break up with him in the hotel.

Record World praised Michael Jackson's lead vocal, the "hypnotic chorus backing" and the horn / string arrangement.

Chart success
The song reached No. 22 on the Billboard pop singles chart and No. 2 on the R&B singles chart. "This Place Hotel" was the group's second biggest single off their Triumph album, behind "Lovely One". The song, in turn, became a popular concert performance for the group's next two tours into Michael's own Bad tour. The song, like "Can You Feel It", was sampled fairly often in hip hop.

Name change
The song's title was changed to "This Place Hotel" to avoid confusion with the 1956 Elvis Presley hit, "Heartbreak Hotel". Michael said he was unaware of the Presley song and the fact that the title was changed. He also denied being influenced by Presley in his autobiography Moonwalk, but acknowledged Presley's importance to both black and white music.

The original title of "Heartbreak Hotel" was used and released commercially on 7" vinyl in many countries, though a 2-track 12" maxi single was produced and  promotional-only copies, given to radio stations and reviewers and a limited 2-track Japanese mini CD single was commercially released in November 1988 (using the newly chosen title), to coincide with the Michael Jackson  Bad tour.

Performances
The song was performed on the Jacksons' Triumph Tour (thus appears on The Jacksons Live album) and was subsequently used on the Jacksons' Victory Tour. When Michael Jackson first toured as a solo act, "This Place Hotel" was the only Jacksons song to be used in both legs of the Bad World Tour, whereas the other songs by the group (with the exception of a medley of early Jackson 5 hits) were retired during the second leg. A spoken word and synth recording preceded the song on the first leg of the Bad tour, but for the second leg of the tour (and on the subsequent Dangerous World Tour) that recording was used as an intro to Jackson's hit "Smooth Criminal" instead.

Releases
The song was included on Michael Jackson's The Ultimate Collection and it has been remixed on the Immortal album in 2011 and was performed live during the Immortal World Tour (Cirque de Soleil) as well as Michael Jackson: One. It was also part of Jackson's Halloween-themed collection, Scream (2017). A live version of the song is available on the 2012 DVD Live at Wembley July 16, 1988. On March 23, 2014, a video clip of a live performance of the song from the Victory Tour was uploaded to the Jacksons' official YouTube account.

Track listing
These are the formats and track listings of major single releases of "This Place Hotel" (previously "Heartbreak Hotel").

Personnel
Written, arranged and composed by Michael Jackson
Produced by the Jacksons
Associate Producer: Greg Phillinganes
Lead and background vocals by Michael Jackson
Additional background vocals: Stephanie Spruill, Maxine Willard Waters, and Julia Tillman Waters
Horn arrangement by Tom Tom 84
Prelude arrangement by Jerry Hey
Instrumentation:
Keyboards: Greg Phillinganes
Guitars: Tito Jackson, David Williams, Mike Sembello, Paul Jackson Jr.
Bass: Nathan Watts
Drums: Ollie E. Brown
Percussion: The Jacksons, Paulinho da Costa
Timpani: Marlon Jackson
Scream: La Toya Jackson

Charts

References

External links
Genius: This Place Hotel - Lyrics

Songs about hotels and motels
1980 singles
1981 singles
1980 songs
The Jackson 5 songs
Songs written by Michael Jackson
Epic Records singles